Lepetodrilus shannonae  is a species of small, deep-sea sea snail, a hydrothermal vent limpet, a marine gastropod mollusk in the family Lepetodrilidae.

Description

Distribution
This species occurs at methane seeps in deep water off the Congo River.

References

Lepetodrilidae
Gastropods described in 2009